Sceptridium jenmanii, the Alabama grapefern or Dixie grapefern, is a species of fern in the Ophioglossaceae native to the southeastern United States.  It is a rare species, and is apparently in decline. Like other grape ferns, it depends on a mycorrhizal association in the soil to survive.

References 

Ophioglossaceae
Ferns of the United States
Taxa named by Lucien Marcus Underwood